Frasera speciosa is a species of flowering plant in the gentian family (Gentianaceae) known by the common names elkweed, deer's ears, and monument plant.

Range and habitat
It is native to the western United States, where it grows in mountain forests, woodlands, and meadows. It tends to grow alone, apart from other members of its species, and is browsed by elk and livestock.

Description

Growth pattern
It is a perennial herb growing from a woody base surrounded by rosettes of large leaves that measure up to 50 centimeters long by 15 wide.

Stems and leaves
It produces a single erect stem which can reach two meters in height.

Inflorescence and fruit
The stem bears whorls of lance-shaped, pointed leaves smaller than those at the base. The plant is monocarpic, growing for several years and only flowering once before it dies. Flowering is synchronized among plants in a given area, with widespread, picturesque blooms occurring periodically. It is not known why some plants in an area will not flower in a mass flowering event, or what cues the plants rely on to initiate flowering. The inflorescence is a tall, erect panicle with flowers densely clustered at the top and then spread out in interrupted clusters below. Each flower has a calyx of four pointed sepals and a corolla of four pointed lobes each one to two centimeters long. The corolla is yellow-green with purple spots and each lobe has two fringed nectary pits at the base. There are four stamens tipped with large anthers and a central ovary.

It blooms from July to August.

References

External links
Jepson Manual Treatment
Washington Burke Museum
Photo gallery

speciosa
Flora of the Western United States
Flora without expected TNC conservation status